Ayatollah Khalil Boyukzadeh (called Moravvej Ardabili in , 18 September 1930  – 16 April 2001) was an Iranian Shiite Ayatollah and politician. He was a member of 1st, 2nd and 3rd Assembly of Experts from Ardabil Province electorate, and he was Representative of the Supreme Leader in Ardabil Province and first imam Jumu'ah for Ardabil in northwest of Iran after Iranian Revolution. An annual commemoration ceremony of Moravvej Ardabili is held in Ardabil.

See also 

 List of Ayatollahs
 List of members in the First Term of the Council of Experts

References

People from Ardabil
1930 births
Representatives of the Supreme Leader in the Provinces of Iran
Members of the Assembly of Experts
2001 deaths